On January 17, 2014, a suicide bomber detonated explosives at the gate of the Taverna du Liban, a heavily fortified restaurant in Kabul popular with foreign nationals, including diplomats, aid workers and journalists; two gunmen then entered the building and began "shooting indiscriminately." 21 people were slain.

The Taliban immediately claimed responsibility for the attack.

Casualties

Wabel Abdallah, head of the Afghanistan office of the International Monetary Fund.
Alexandros Petersen, a scholar of energy and of the geopolitics of the Caucasus and Central Asia. Petersen had recently joined the faculty at the American University in Kabul.

See also
 List of terrorist attacks in Kabul

References

January restaurant attack
2014 murders in Afghanistan
January 2014 restaurant attack
2014 mass shootings in Asia
21st-century mass murder in Afghanistan
January 2014 restaurant
Attacks on restaurants in Asia
Islamic terrorism in Kabul
Islamic terrorist incidents in 2014
January 2014 crimes in Asia
January 2014 events in Afghanistan
Mass murder in 2014
January 2014 restaurant attack
Mass shootings in Afghanistan
Massacres in Afghanistan
Suicide bombings in 2014
January 2014 restaurant attack
Taliban attacks
Terrorist incidents in Afghanistan in 2014
Building bombings in Afghanistan